Isiah Moses Walter "I. M." Hipp (born February 15, 1956) is a former American football player who played running back in college for the Nebraska Cornhuskers and one season in the National Football League (NFL) for the Oakland Raiders.

College career
Hipp joined the Cornhuskers as a walk-on from Chapin, South Carolina. When he finished career at Nebraska he was the team's all-time leader in rushing yards at 3,040.

NFL career
Hipp was drafted in the fourth round in the 1980 NFL Draft as the 104th overall pick. He was released by the Falcons, but was signed in October 1980 by the Oakland Raiders. He played one game in the NFL.

References

1956 births
Living people
American football running backs
Oakland Raiders players
Nebraska Cornhuskers football players
Players of American football from South Carolina
People from Chapin, South Carolina